Donovan Wylie (born 1971) is an Irish photographer from Northern Ireland, based in Belfast. His work chronicles what he calls "the concept of vision as power in the architecture of contemporary conflict" – prison, army watchtowers and outposts, and listening stations – "merging documentary and art photography".

Wylie's work has been exhibited in solo exhibitions at the Imperial War Museum and The Photographers' Gallery in London, National Science and Media Museum in Bradford, and Royal Ontario Museum in Toronto; and is held in the collections of the Centre Georges Pompidou in Paris, Metropolitan Museum of Art in New York, Tate Modern in London, Yale University Art Gallery, Milwaukee Art Museum, National Gallery of Canada in Ottawa, Science Museum Group in the UK, Ulster Museum in Belfast, and Victoria and Albert Museum in London. In 2010 he was shortlisted for the Deutsche Börse Photography Prize. He was a member of Magnum Photos from 1998 to 2017.

Wylie has also made films – in 2002 he won a British Academy Film Award (BAFTA) for The Train, a 50 minute documentary written, directed and with cinematography by Wylie.

Career
Wylie was born in 1971 in Belfast, Northern Ireland. He started photography in his teens while a pupil at Belfast Royal Academy, and at the age of 16 he left school and went on a three-month journey around Ireland. These travels resulted in his first book, 32 Counties, published when he was 18. In 1992, at age 20, Wylie became a nominee of the Magnum Photos agency, then a full member in 1998, and left the organisation in 2017.

Since 2000, he has completed various photographic and film projects exploring the religious identity, history, and the concept of territory, especially in Northern Ireland during The Troubles, post-ceasefire. His work has expanded over the years, and concentrates on the "architecture of conflict". His notable works include projects on The Maze Prison in Northern Ireland (2002 and 2007–2008), British watchtowers (2005–2006), and the Green Zone in Baghdad (2008). He has also worked in China, Russia, Slovakia, Spain, Israel, and Yugoslavia.

The Guardian'''s review of Wylie's Vision as Power exhibition at the Imperial War Museum in London stated: "Merging documentary and art photography, Wylie's images reveal both the impact of surveillance architecture on the natural landscape and the importance of surveillance in modern conflict."

Wylie's book The Maze (2004) is included in Parr and Badger's The Photobook:  A History, Volume II, and his Scrapbook (2009) is included in Volume III.In 2013, Wylie was a Doran Artist in Residence at Yale University Art Gallery, a residency that resulted in a body of American work titled A Good and Spacious Land.   An exhibition of the work opened there in June 2017 alongside work by Jim Goldberg.

In 2018/2019, as a response to Brexit, he travelled around the British Isles, photographing lighthouses from neighbouring coastlines.

Publications
Publications by Wylie32 Counties: Photographs of Ireland.London: Secker & Warburg, 1989. .
London: Secker & Warburg, 1990. .The Dispossessed. UK: Picador, 1990. With Robert McLiam WilsonPopulations in Danger. UK: J. Libbey, 1992.Ireland: Singular Images. London: André Deutsch, 1994. .Notes from MoscowTransatlantic, 1994. .
UK: Picador, 2004.Losing Ground. Fourth Estate, 1998. . With an afterword by Andrew O'Hagan.The Maze.London: Granta, 2004. .
Göttingen: Steidl, 2010. .British Watchtowers. Göttingen: Steidl, 2007. .Scrapbook. Göttingen: Steidl, 2009. . With Timothy Prus.Outposts: Kandahar Province. Göttingen: Steidl, 2011. . With an afterword by Gerry Badger.North Warning System. Göttingen: Steidl, 2014. .

Publications paired with othersA Good and Spacious Land. New Haven, CT: Yale, 2017. . A two-volume set with Jim Goldberg's Candy. With an introduction by Pamela Franks and essays by Christopher Klatell and Laura Wexler.

FilmsThe Train (Witness, episode 25) (2001), written, directed and with cinematography by Wylie – Channel 4/October Films, 50 minutes, produced by Liana Pomerantsev, Russian with English subtitles.YoYo (2002) – Channel 4/October Films.Jesus Comes To London (2003) – Channel 4/October Films.The 12th (season 1, episode 3) (2003), directed by Wylie – 10 minutes, produced by Fulcrum Waddell Media.

Solo exhibitionsThe Maze, The Photographers' Gallery, London, 2004.Outposts, National Science and Media Museum, Bradford, 2011; Royal Ontario Museum, Toronto, 2012.Vision as Power, Imperial War Museum, London, 2013. Photographs from The Maze, British Watchtowers, Green Zone, Outposts and Arctic.Awards
2002: Winner, "New Director – Factual", British Academy Television Craft Awards, British Academy of Film and Television Arts (BAFTA), for The Train.2002: Royal Photographic Society Vic Odden Award, Bath, UK.
2009: Shortlisted for the Deutsche Börse Photography Prize 2010."The 2010 Deutsche Börse Prize shortlist" Francis Hodgson, Financial Times, 27 February 2010. Accessed 24 June 2017
2010: Bradford Fellowship 2010/11 from Bradford College, University of Bradford and National Science and Media Museum, UK to make Outposts.Wright, Philippa. "Introducing Donovan Wylie's 'Outposts'", National Science and Media Museum blog, 10 August 2011. Accessed 1 May 2020

Collections
Metropolitan Museum of Art, New York City: complete 80-picture edition of The Maze."Collection / 80 results for "Donovan Wylie" out of 446,898 records" Metropolitan Museum of Art. Accessed 29 June 2017
Tate Modern, London:  5 prints from "British Watchtowers".  
Victoria and Albert Museum, London: 6 prints
Milwaukee Art Museum, Milwaukee, WI: 3 items
Irish Museum of Modern Art, Dublin
National Gallery of Canada, Ottawa, Ontario: 4 prints"Search the Collection" National Gallery of Canada. Accessed 29 June 2017
Science Museum Group, UK: complete set of 42 prints from Losing Ground''
Centre Georges Pompidou, Paris: 6 prints
Ulster Museum, Belfast

References

External links
Photography Blog article on Wylie
The Daily Telegraph article on Deutsch Borse Photography prize
British Journal of Photography interview
Donovan Wylie talks about his Outposts series of work

Magnum photographers
Photographers from Northern Ireland
Living people
1971 births